The 2019–20 Blackpool F.C. season was the club's 111th season in the English Football League and their third-consecutive season in League One, the third tier of the Football League. The season covered the period from 1 July 2019 to 30 June 2020. Blackpool finished a curtailed season in 13th place.

Along with competing in League One, the club were also participants in three cup competitions. They were knocked out of the FA Cup in the third round by Reading, after a replay; they were eliminated from the EFL Cup in the first round by Macclesfield Town; and they were knocked out of the EFL Trophy in the second round by Scunthorpe United.

Terry McPhillips resigned as manager on 5 July after one season in charge. He was succeeded by Simon Grayson, who returned to the club after leaving them for Leeds United in 2008. Grayson was sacked on 12 February after a string of defeats. Neil Critchley was appointed as his successor on 2 March.

Pre-season
Eight players were released at the end of the 2018–19 campaign: defender Donervon Daniels; midfielders John O'Sullivan, Finlay Sinclair-Smith and Chris Taylor; and forwards Max Clayton, Mark Cullen and Chris Long. Forward Scott Quigley joined Barrow on a free transfer.

Simon Sadler was announced as Blackpool's new owner on 13 June, ending a 32-year reign of the Oyston family.

Prior to Terry McPhillips' departure on 5 July, Blackpool agreed moves for five players, all from free agency. The first arrival was 27-year-old former Solihull Moors striker Adi Yussuf. (Yussuf returned to Solihull on loan in September without making an appearance for Blackpool.) Central defender Ryan Edwards, 25, left Plymouth Argyle at the end of the 2018–19 season after turning down a new contract. Irish midfielder, 28-year-old Jamie Devitt, put pen to paper after rejecting a contract renewal from Carlisle United. (Devitt was loaned out to Gary Bowyer's Bradford City on 23 August.) Fellow midfielder Ben Tollitt joined the following day. The 24-year-old had been released by Tranmere Rovers. (Tollitt was loaned out to Wrexham on 23 August.) Into July, 23-year-old former Crystal Palace midfielder Sullay Kaikai terminated his contract with NAC Breda to move to Bloomfield Road.

Simon Grayson's first bit of business was bringing in 22-year-old Scottish striker Ryan Hardie from Rangers for an undisclosed fee. The following week, Hardie was joined by his former Rangers teammate, goalkeeper Jak Alnwick, on a year-long loan. That meant Blackpool had five goalkeepers in their squad, until Myles Boney departed on loan to South Shields on 25 July. Left-back James Husband joined on loan from Norwich City on 26 July, again on a year-long term.

Left-back Marc Bola left to join Middlesbrough on 28 July for an undisclosed fee, but returned on-loan in January until the end of the season. He was Blackpool's Player of the Year for 2018–19.

Two days before the season kick-off, Belgian centre-back Rocky Bushiri joined on loan from Nottingham Forest. Striker Joe Nuttall also signed, for an undisclosed fee, from Blackburn.

On the eve of the campaign, Blackpool had a squad of 28 players. The depth in positions: four goalkeepers, seven defenders, nine midfielders and eight forwards.

Results 

Blackpool's opening pre-season friendly was at Dundee on 9 July. The hosts won the game by a single goal.

A week later, Blackpool faced local side AFC Fylde at Mill Farm. They won 2–0, with goals from Nathan Delfouneso and a debut strike from Adi Yussuf.

On 20 July, a split squad travelled to both Altrincham and Barrow. The Altrincham side lost 2–1 (Ben Tollitt netting for the visitors), while the Barrow side won 3–0, with strikes from Nathan Delfouneso, Armand Gnanduillet and an own-goal from Connor Brown. Former Seasider Ian Evatt, now manager of the hosts, came on as a late substitute to officially end his playing career, against the manager who brought him to Bloomfield Road in 2006.

Blackpool's first home friendly was against Blackburn Rovers on 27 July. They lost 2–0 to the Championship side. Jak Alnwick was given a starting debut, while James Husband came on as a substitute just after the hour mark.

Their final friendly before the season officially kicked off was at Longridge Town on 28 July. Goals from Callum Guy, Yusifu Ceesay, Harry Pritchard and Adi Yussuf helped the Seasiders to a 4–2 win.

On 6 August, three days after their opening 2−0 League One win at home to Bristol Rovers, Blackpool played a hastily arranged friendly against Fleetwood Town at Town's Poolfoot Farm training facility in Thornton-Cleveleys. The match finished 1–1, with Michael Nottingham scoring Blackpool's equalising goal.

In detail

Season proper

On 20 June 2019, the EFL League One fixtures were revealed.

August
Blackpool opened their League campaign at home to Bristol Rovers on 3 August, and gave a starting debut to four players: Jak Alnwick, James Husband, Ryan Edwards and Sullay Kaikai. A crowd of over 11,000 watched Jay Spearing put the hosts ahead from the penalty spot in the 28th minute after Rovers' goalkeeper Anssi Jaakkola caught Curtis Tilt with the follow-through of a punch to clear the ball. Armand Gnanduillet doubled the lead a minute after the break with a diving header from Spearing's cross. The result put the Tangerines second in the table, behind local rivals Fleetwood Town.

A week later, Blackpool travelled to the south coast to face Southend. Simon Grayson retained the same lineup that started against Bristol Rovers. An own-goal from the hosts' Harry Lennon gave the Seasiders the lead after nine minutes. Three minutes later, Nathan Delfouneso opened his scoring account for the campaign with a strike. He scored his second on 37 minutes, giving Blackpool a 3–0 lead at the break. James Husband was given a straight red card for a reckless challenge on Elvis Bwomono. Simon Cox pulled one back for Southend with fifteen minutes to go. Blackpool moved to the top of the table on goal-difference with the victory.

On 13 August, Blackpool began their EFL Cup campaign with a home fixture against Macclesfield Town. Ollie Turton put Blackpool ahead just after the half-hour mark. The visitors levelled on 39 minutes via a Rocky Bushiri own-goal. Macclesfield went ahead midway into the second half through Virgil Gomis. Armand Gnanduillet equalised from the penalty spot in the 90th minute. The match went to a penalty shootout, which Macclesfield won 4–2.

Back to League business, Oxford United visited Bloomfield Road on 17 August. The hosts were without Jay Spearing, who injured his shoulder in midweek, and the suspended James Husband. Ollie Turton deputised as captain in Spearing's absence. Ryan Edwards opened the scoring with a header on five minutes. Armand Gnanduillet doubled the lead from the penalty spot two minutes into first-half injury time after he was felled. Josh Ruffels pulled one back for the visitors two minutes later. The hosts held on for the victory, despite Oxford having 69% of the possession and 23 shots. Blackpool dropped to second in the table after Lincoln City, the only other team with a 100% record, won 4–0 at home to Southend.

Blackpool made a midweek trip to Gilligham on 20 August. After going two goals down inside 37 minutes to a brace from Alex Jakubiak, Sullay Kaikai scored his first goal for the Tangerines to put them back in the game. Armand Gnanduillet scored his fourth goal of the campaign in first-half injury time to level matters. The match finished 2–2, and Blackpool returned to the top of the table after Lincoln City lost at MK Dons.

On 23 August, two players departed on loan — Jamie Devitt to Bradford City and Ben Tollitt to Wrexham — while Ben Heneghan returned to the club on loan until January.

The following day, Blackpool made the trip to Spotland Stadium to face Rochdale. The match finished goalless. Blackpool dropped to second place after Ipswich Town won 5–0 at Bolton.

On 27 August, Simon Grayson made his third permanent signing of the season when left-back Calum Macdonald joined from Derby County on a free transfer. On 30 August, the eve of Blackpool's home match against Portsmouth, Sean Scannell joined in a permanent deal from Bradford City. Harry Pritchard went in the opposite direction. Meanwhile, midfielder Yusifu Ceesay joined Altrincham on loan until January.

Portsmouth took the lead in said match, Marcus Harness finding the net after 17 minutes. Armand Gnanduillet scored his fifth goal of the season just before the hour mark to maintain the hosts' unbeaten campaign. Blackpool dropped to third position in the table.

September
Blackpool made a winning start to their EFL Trophy campaign on 3 September with a 5–1 scoreline against Morecambe at Bloomfield Road. Ben Heneghan opened the scoring after four minutes. Kevin Ellison levelled for the visitors midway through the first half, before Michael Nottingham restored the home side's lead one minute into first-half injury time. Ryan Hardie scored his first goal for Blackpool six minutes after the break to make it 3–1. Substitute Sullay Kaikai made it 4–1 on 89 minutes. Joe Nuttall also opened his account for Blackpool with a goal one minute into injury time.

Back to League duty on 7 September, Blackpool made the trip to Birmingham's St Andrew's stadium to face a homeless Coventry City. Sullay Kaikai opened the scoring inside the first minute. He repeated the feat after 38 minutes, but Coventry levelled matters before the break, with goals from Matt Godden on 41 minutes and, five minutes later, Wesley Jobello. Callum O'Hare, on loan from Aston Villa scored what proved to be the winner one minute into injury time. Blackpool had played the last eight minutes with ten men after substitute Nathan Delfouneso went off with hamstring tightness on 87 minutes. The result ended Blackpool's unbeaten start to the League season, while also extending Coventry's. Blackpool dropped to sixth place, three points behind new leaders Wycombe Wanderers.

A second-consecutive defeat occurred on 14 September at home to MK Dons. Russell Martin scored the visitors' first goal on five minutes. A mistake by Curtis Tilt let Jordan Houghton through, who made it 2–0 just after the hour mark. David Kasumu made it 3–0 with fifteen minutes remaining. Blackpool dropped to ninth place in the table.

A midweek away trip to Doncaster Rovers on 17 September resulted in a single-goal victory for Blackpool. Armand Gnanduillet, in the third minute of injury time, headed his sixth goal in all competitions. Blackpool's three points saw them climb four places to fifth in the table.

A short trip to Accrington Stanley on 21 September ended with a 1–1 draw. A Curtis Tilt own goal on 16 minutes was cancelled-out in injury time by Matty Virtue. Blackpool dropped one place to sixth.

Six days later, Blackpool hosted Lincoln City, under the managership for the first time of the Tangerines former manager Michael Appleton. Sean Scannell, in his first start for Blackpool, scored his first goal for the club on eleven minutes. Jordan Thompson doubled the lead ten minutes later. Jack Payne halved the Imps deficit on 24 minutes. Blackpool climbed to fourth place with their victory.

October
Into October, Blackpool travelled to the University of Bolton Stadium to face Bolton Wanderers for a Monday night game. The match ended goalless. Blackpool had climbed one place to fifth after Saturday's results; this point moved them back up to fourth.

On 12 October, Rotherham United were the visitors to Bloomfield Road. Michael Smith put Rotherham ahead on 51 minutes. Former Blackpool player Clark Robertson made it two with three minutes of normal time remaining. Armand Gnanduillet pulled one back from the penalty spot nine minutes into added time. Blackpool fell to sixth place with the defeat. Blackpool received five bookings during the match, bringing their tally to eleven in the last three games.

The following Tuesday saw a trip north to face Carlisle United in their second group-stage match. United keeper Louis Gray let the ball rebound into the net through his legs to give the Tangerines a 25th-minute lead. Carlisle levelled two minutes into first-half injury time through Ryan Loft. They went ahead for the first time three minutes from the end of normal time via Canice Carroll. Blackpool dropped to second in the group, behind Wolverhampton Wanderers U21s, with the defeat.

Wycombe Wanderers were the visitors to Bloomfield Road on 22 October. Scott Kashket put Wycombe in the lead in the eighth minute. Ben Heneghan equalised for Simon Grayson's men on 68 minutes. Those were the only goals of the game, and Blackpool dropped to eighth place in the table.

On 26 October, Blackpool visited Nigel Clough's Burton Albion. The match finished goalless, despite Curtis Tilt being sent off for two yellow cards just short of the hour mark. Blackpool, who had slipped to their lowest placing of the campaign thus far, climbed one place to ninth.

November
On 2 November, Blackpool welcomed Peterborough United to the seaside. Blackpool were without Curtis Tilt, who was serving a suspension for his dismissal in the previous match. Mohamed Eisa opened the scoring for the visitors on 13 minutes. A Niall Mason own-goal brought the hosts level just before the half-hour mark. Armand Gnanduillet put Blackpool ahead for the first time on 41 minutes, but four minutes later Ivan Toney restored parity. Two minutes into the second half, Gnanduillet scored from the penalty spot, his ninth goal in all competitions this campaign, to put Blackpool ahead again. Marcus Maddison made it 3–3 with nineteen minutes remaining, but another Peterborough own-goal, this time from Dan Butler, proved to be the winning goal on 74 minutes. Blackpool climbed one place to eighth with the victory.

Blackpool progressed to the second round of the EFL Trophy after a single-goal win at home to Wolverhampton Wanderers U21s on 5 November. Rocky Bushiri scored his first goal for the club three minutes into stoppage time. Mark Howard made his first appearance for Blackpool since March, having overcome an Achilles tendon injury.

Morecambe made the 40-mile trip to Bloomfield Road for an FA Cup first-round meeting on 9 November. Nathan Delfouneso put the Seasiders ahead just inside ten minutes. Armand Gnanduillet doubled their lead on 24 minutes, bringing his tally for the season to ten. Matty Virtue scored his second goal of the season just before half-time to make it 3–0. The Shrimps Cole Stockton pulled one back two minutes in first-half stoppage time. Sullay Kaikai made it 4–1 with six minutes remaining.

Prior to kick-off in the League One fixture against AFC Wimbledon at Bloomfield Road on 16 November, a minute's applause honoured the memories of Cyril Robinson and Les Campbell, who both died during the week. Robinson had been the last surviving member of Blackpool's 1953 FA Cup winning team. To mark that, another minute's applause occurred for him on 53 minutes. In the match, a double from Armand Gnanduillet gave Blackpool the three points, and their fourth consecutive win in all competitions. Gnanduillet had now scored twelve goals in all competitions. Blackpool climbed three places to fifth in the table.

On 23 November, the Seasiders made the trip to Suffolk to take on then-league-leaders Ipswich Town. Mark Howard was not included in the 18 named players for the match. Gwion Edwards put the Tractor Boys ahead on eight minutes. Joe Nuttall, replacing the injured Armand Gnadnuillet, levelled proceedings on 22 minutes. Eight minutes into the second half, Jay Spearing put the visitors ahead for the first time from the spot. Another penalty, scored by Luke Garbutt, brought the hosts level. Blackpool, whose unbeaten run was extended to seven games, dropped three places to eighth in the table. The attendance was 19,503, around 500 of which was travelling support.

Four days later, Scunthorpe United knocked Blackpool out of the EFL Trophy at the second-round stage when they won 3–1 at Bloomfield Road. Simon Grayson made eight changes from the side that had faced Ipswich. Kevin van Veen put the Iron ahead on 12 minutes. Abobaker Eisa made it two thirteen minutes later. Joe Nuttall pulled one back on 70 minutes, with his second goal in as many games, but the visitors scored a third in stoppage time, Eisa getting his second. Callum Guy was sent off for a second bookable offence on 73 minutes.

December
Blackpool progressed to the third round of the FA Cup on 1 December with a 3–1 victory over Maidstone United at Bloomfield Road. Saidou Khan put the visitors ahead just before the half-hour mark. A George Elokobi own goal brought Blackpool level two minutes into the second half. Nathan Delfouneso then scored twice in as many minutes to seal the win for Blackpool. 16-year-old Tony Weston made his professional debut for the Seasiders as a substitute one minute before the end of normal time.

On 7 December, Fleetwood Town made the eight-mile journey south for the Fylde Coast derby. Liam Feeney put Blackpool ahead on 11 minutes with not only his first goal for the club but his first in two years. A Sullay Kaikai free-kick doubled their lead two minutes into the second half. Armand Gnanduillet scored his 13th goal of the season on 65 minutes. Substitute Conor McAleny pulled one back for the Fishermen with ten minutes of normal time remaining. Blackpool climbed to fourth in the table with the three points.

Seven days later, Blackpool travelled to Sunderland. Matty Virtue put the Tangerines in the lead on four minutes. Charlie Wyke equalised for Phil Parkinson's men on 37 minutes. Blackpool dropped one place to fifth with the draw.

On 21 December, Blackpool hosted Shrewsbury Town. Fejiri Okenabirhie's penalty on 56 minutes separated the sides. Blackpool dropped two places to seventh with the defeat.

A Boxing Day fixture against Accrington Stanley at Bloomfield Road ended with the visitors taking home the three points after Sean McConville scored the only goal of the game one minute into stoppage time. Jack Sims made his first-team debut for the Seasiders after coming on as a first-half substitute for the injured Jak Alnwick. A second-consecutive home loss, Blackpool dropped to tenth, their lowest placing of the season thus far.

Tranmere Rovers, managed by former Blackpool midfielder Micky Mellon, welcomed the Tangerines on 29 December. Mark Howard made his first league appearance for the club in nine months, having recovered from injury. Ben Heneghan put the visitors ahead on ten minutes. Morgan Ferrier equalised just before half time. Blackpool remained tenth with the point.

January
On New Year's Day, Blackpool travelled to Rotherham United. They lost 2–1, with Armand Gnanduillet netting their goal. Their third defeat in four league games, Blackpool remained in tenth place. The club had made two new signings in the previous few days: midfielder Grant Ward, who was unattached after leaving Ipswich Town, and defender Jordan Thorniley, from Sheffield Wednesday for an undisclosed fee.

On 4 January, Blackpool faced Reading at the Madejski Stadium in the third round of the FA Cup. Nathan Delfouneso put Blackpool ahead just before the half-hour. Sam Baldock equalised for the Royals eleven minutes into the second half. Armand Gnanduillet put the visitors ahead again four minutes later, only for Danny Loader to restore parity. Gnanduillet had the chance to put Blackpool ahead again, but his chipped penalty hit the crossbar.

Ryan Hardie joined Plymouth Argyle on loan on 9 January.

Reading won the FA Cup third-round replay 2–0 at Bloomfield Road on 14 January. After being omitted from Reading's squad in the original fixture, Charlie Adam came on as an injury-time substitute to face his former club for the first time since leaving in 2011. It was the hosts' fourth defeat in six matches.

Blackpool made several transfers the following week. Forward Gary Madine, a free agent after being released by Cardiff City earlier in the month, returned to the club on a permanent basis. He was there on loan in 2015. Also incoming, midfielder Connor Ronan joined on loan from Wolves. Left-back Nick Anderton joined Carlisle United, while midfielder Jordan Thompson signed for Stoke City, both for undisclosed fees. Forward Rowan Roache was released. Going out on loan were goalkeeper Christoffer Mafoumbi to Morecambe, forward Adi Yussuf to Boreham Wood and defender Michael Nottingham to Crewe Alexandra. Ben Heneghan's loan from Sheffield United, meanwhile, was extended until the end of the season.

On 18 January, Blackpool returned to league duty with a visit to Lincoln City. They lost by a single goal, dropping to 15th place in the table.

On 24 January, goalkeeper Chris Maxwell joined on a free transfer, having had his contract with Preston North End cancelled by mutual consent.

The following day, James Husband made his move from Norwich City a permanent one.

On 28 January, Blackpool travelled to Wycombe Wanderers. They went two down inside the first ten minutes. New loan signing Kiernan Dewsbury-Hall scored on his debut to pull one back late on.

The month was closed out with several incomings and outgoings in the transfer market. Arriving at Bloomfield Road were right-back Teddy Howe (from Reading) and midfielder Ben Garrity (from Warrington Town) on permanent contracts, while centre-back Taylor Moore joined on loan from Bristol City until the end of the season. Out went Ben Tollitt (released), Callum Guy (to Carlisle United) and Curtis Tilt (to Rotherham United).

February

On 1 February, Blackpool faced Oxford United at the Kassam Stadium, their fifth-consecutive away league match. Gary Madine put the Tangerines ahead on ten minutes, but a double from Marcus Browne before the end of the first half gave the hosts the three points.

Seven days later, Blackpool procured their first victory in ten matches, 2–1 at home to Sol Campbell's Southend United. Armand Gnanduillet scored both for the hosts, bringing his tally for the season to 17 goals in all competitions.

On 11 February, Gillingham made the long midweek trip to Bloomfield Road, where they were 3–2 victors. Armand Gnanduillet put Blackpool ahead on seven minutes, a lead they held for over an hour, until John Akinde levelled matters in the 73rd minute. Regan Charles-Cook put the visitors ahead three minutes later, before substitute Nathan Delfouneso restored parity one minute into stoppage time. Four minutes later, however, Brandon Hanlan scored the winner. Blackpool had now lost eight of their last eleven matches. Simon Grayson was sacked the following day, and David Dunn was put in temporary charge.

Bristol Rovers hosted Blackpool on 15 February. Gary Madine put the Tangerines in front on two minutes. Two minutes before the break, Ben Heneghan was given a straight red card. Alfie Kilgour brought Rovers level on 73 minutes, before Josh Ginnelly scored the winner for the hosts six minutes from the end of normal time. Their eighth defeat in ten league games, Blackpool dropped to 16th place, their lowest placing of the season thus far.

On 22 February, Blackpool returned from a trip to AFC Wimbledon with a point after a goalless draw.

Three days later, the Tangerines hosted Bolton Wanderers. Connor Ronan scored his first goal for Blackpool on 13 minutes. Kean Bryan equalised for the visitor on 88 minutes, but Kiernan Dewsbury-Hall netted his second goal for the club in the final minute of normal time. Blackpool climbed two places to 14th with the victory.

Blackpool, unchanged for the third straight match, closed out February with a second-consecutive victory, against Ipswich Town at Bloomfield Road, and again the winner came in the final minutes. Kiernan Dewsbury-Hall scored his third goal for the club on 26 minutes. Freddie Sears levelled for the visitors nine minutes into the second half. Substitute Joe Nuttall scored his second League goal of the campaign three minutes into added time; his first came in the reverse fixture at Portman Road. Blackpool climbed one place to 13th with the three points.

March
On 2 March, Blackpool appointed Neil Critchley as Simon Grayson's full-time replacement, in a head coach capacity – a first for the club. He left his role as Liverpool's under-23s manager to move to Bloomfield Road.

Critchley's first match in charge was the Fylde Coast derby, at Fleetwood on 7 March, which finished goalless.

Three days later, Blackpool hosted Tranmere Rovers. Micky Mellon's team were 2–0 up at half-time. Kiernan Dewsbury-Hall, with his fourth goal for the club, pulled one back in the second half. Blackpool remained in thirteenth place in the table.

On 13 March, in response to the COVID-19 pandemic, the EFL suspended all competitions until at least 3 April. Three Blackpool fixtures were affected: Sunderland (H; 14 March), Shrewsbury (A; 21 March) and Peterborough (A; 29 March). The home fixture against Burton on 4 April would be the first fixture they could play. On 9 June, clubs voted to curtail the season, meaning the final table would be calculated by a points-per-game method with the play-offs being played as normal. Blackpool finished in thirteenth position.

EFL League One

League table

Results

In summary

By matchday

In detail

 – Delayed due to medical emergency
 – Fixture was postponed due to Tranmere's FA Cup progression.
 – Season was suspended until 3 April due to the COVID-19 pandemic.
 – On 3 April, the English Football League decided to postpone all football until safe to do so due to the COVID-19 pandemic.

FA Cup

EFL Cup

The first-round draw was made on 20 June.

EFL Trophy

On 9 July 2019, the pre-determined group stage draw was announced with invited clubs to be drawn on 12 July 2019.  Blackpool were drawn in Northern Group G. They finished top after their three matches. The draw for the second round was made on 16 November 2019 live on Sky Sports.

Squad statistics

Players used: 36
Goals scored: 63 (including five own-goals)

Statistics accurate as of 10 March 2020

Transfers

Transfers in

Transfers out

Loans in

Loans out

References

Blackpool F.C. seasons
Blackpool F.C.